Anna Maria Roos (9 April 1862 – 23 April 1938) was a Swedish educator, author, theosophist and songwriter.

Biography 
Roos was born to Postmaster General Adolf Wilhelm Roos and Sophie Maria Roos née Nordenfalk in 1862 in Stockholm, Sweden. She was the granddaughter of Minister of Justice Johan Nordenfalk. Roos was the only girl in her family and had a tumultuous upbringing, reflected in her work. Her childhood summers were spent with her grandmother, Baroness Maria Nordenfalk, at Blekhem.

She was said to have been a voracious reader and learner. She was educated at the Högre lärarinneseminariet in Stockholm in 1879–1881. Roos was involved in the arts but her passion was for writing. Roos was a popular children's author, illustrator and songwriter.

She was an early member of the women's association Nya Idun and was the president of the literary society Samfundet De Nio. Roos was editorial secretary of cultural journal  from 1898 to 1902.

She died in Bombay, India, in 1938.

Selected publications

Possibility of Miracles (1929)
The Call of the Time (1933)

References

 Lindell, Ebbe (1999). Gam-la läs-lä-ror. Malmö skolmuseums utgåva, 1103-209X ; 23. Malmö: Malmö skolmuseum. sid. 81–106. Libris 3102037
 Löfgren, Eva Margareta (1996). "Historien om Sörgården.". Från Sörgården till Lop-nor / Bo Ollén, red. (Stockholm : Carlsson, 1996): sid. 188–239, 246–247 : ill.. Libris 2273656

Further reading
 

1862 births
1938 deaths
Children's songwriters
Writers from Stockholm
Swedish educators
Swedish songwriters
Swedish Theosophists
Swedish women writers
Members of Nya Idun